The discography of English blues rock musician John Mayall, including the band John Mayall & the Bluesbreakers, consists of 35 studio albums, 34 live albums, 24 compilation albums, four extended plays (EPs), 44 singles and four video albums. Mayall's 36th studio album was released in 2019.

Mayall began his recording career in 1963 with the formation of John Mayall & the Bluesbreakers. After several early lineup changes and live debut John Mayall Plays John Mayall, the band released their self-titled debut studio album Blues Breakers with Eric Clapton in 1966, which featured guitarist Eric Clapton, bassist John McVie and drummer Hughie Flint. The album reached number 6 on the UK Albums Chart and was certified gold by the British Phonographic Industry. With new guitarist Peter Green and drummer Aynsley Dunbar, A Hard Road followed in 1967. It reached the UK Albums Chart top ten. Crusade, featuring Mick Taylor on guitar and Keef Hartley on drums, was released later in the year and peaked at number 8. It was also the group's first release to chart in the US, reaching number 136 on the Billboard 200.

Mayall's third release of 1967 was his debut solo studio album, The Blues Alone, which managed only to reach number 24 in the UK and number 128 in the US. The band's second and third live albums, The Diary of a Band, followed in January 1968 (by which time McVie had left), both of which reached the UK top 30 and the US top 100. A fourth studio album, Bare Wires, was the band's most successful to date, peaking at number 3 on the UK Albums Chart and number 59 on the US Billboard 200. Shortly after the album's release, however, the Bluesbreakers fell apart as several members left, and the group was disbanded. Relocating to the US with Taylor, Mayall released Blues from Laurel Canyon later in 1968, which reached number 33 on the UK Albums Chart and number 68 on the US Billboard 200.

Taylor left Mayall in June 1969 to join The Rolling Stones. The frontman replaced him with Jon Mark and released the live album The Turning Point later in the year, which was his first release to reach the US top 40 when it peaked at number 32. It was also certified gold by the Recording Industry Association of America. Compilation Looking Back was released around the same time, reaching number 14 in the UK and number 79 in the US. Empty Rooms followed in 1970, which saw Mayall return to the UK top ten. USA Union was released in the summer, featuring former Canned Heat members Harvey Mandel on guitar and Larry Taylor on bass, which reached a career record number 22 on the US Billboard 200. 1971's Back to the Roots peaked at number 31 in the UK and number 52 in the US.

Mayall continued to restructure his band and release new studio and live material throughout the 1970s and 1980s, with limited commercial success. In 1982 he returned to using the Bluesbreakers moniker, and in 1993 he registered on the UK Albums Chart for the first time in more than 20 years when Wake Up Call reached number 61. Since 2009, Mayall has been recording and touring under his own name, after retiring the Bluesbreaker name in late 2008.

Albums

Studio albums

Live albums

Compilations

Extended plays

Singles

Video albums

References

External links
John Mayall official discography

Mayall, John
Mayall, John
Mayall, John